Benga is a Bantu language spoken by the Benga people of Equatorial Guinea and Gabon. It has a dialectal variation called Bapuku. Benga speakers inhabit a small coastal portion of Río Muni, the Cape of San Juan, suburban enclaves of Rio Benito and Bata, the islands of Corisco, Small Elobey and Great Elobey.

See also
 Bube language

References

External links 
Presentation of the Benga language by linguist Patrick Mouguiama-Daouda

Texts 

 
Languages of Equatorial Guinea
Languages of Gabon
Sawabantu languages